Trevor Dodds is a Scottish curler.

At the national level, he is a 1978 Scottish junior champion curler.

Teams

Men's

Mixed

Personal life
His daughter is curler Jennifer Dodds. She currently plays second on Team Eve Muirhead.

References

External links

Search results for "Trevor Dodds" - Edinburgh Curling Club

Living people
Scottish male curlers
Year of birth missing (living people)
Place of birth missing (living people)